The following list is a discography of production by Matt Martians, an American record producer. It includes a list of songs produced and co-produced by year, artist, album and title.

Solo

2017

The Drum Chord Theory
 01. "Spend The Night / If You Were My Girlfrend"
 02. "What Love Is"
 03. "Where Are Yo Friends?"
 04. "Baby Girl"
 05. "Southern Isolation"
 06. "Found Me Some Acid Tonight" 
 07. "Alotta Women / Useless" 
 08. "Down"
 10. "Callin' On Me"
 11. "Diamond in da Ruff"
 12. "Elevators "

2019

The Last Party 
 04. "Off My Feet/Westside Rider Anthem"
 05. "Pony Fly" 
 06. "Southern Isolation 2"
 07. "Look Like" 

Notes
 "Diamond in da Ruff" contains hidden track "Feelin"

Steve Lacy

2022

Gemini Rights 
 06. 2Gether (Enterlude)

The Internet

2011

Purple Naked Ladies
 01. "Violet Nude Women"
 02. "They Say / Shangrila (feat. Tay Walker)"
 03. "She DGAF"
 04. "Cunt"
 05. "Cocaine / Tevie"
 06. "Ode to a Dream"
 07. "Gurl (feat. Pyramid Vritra)"
 09. "Lincoln (feat. Left Brain & Mike G)"
 11. "She Knows"
 13. "Visions (feat. Coco O.)"
 14. "The Garden"

2013

Feel Good
 05. "Pupil / The Patience"
 06. "Red Balloon"
 09. "Matt's Apartment"
 13. "Higher Times (feat. Jesse Boykins III)"

2015

Ego Death
 01. "Get Away"
 02. "Gabby (feat. Janelle Monáe)"
 03. "Under Control"
 04. "Go With It (feat. Vic Mensa)
 06. "For the World (feat. James Fauntleroy)
 08. "Special Affair"
 09. "Something's Missing"
 11. "Penthouse Cloud"

2018

Hive Mind 
 01. "Come Together"
 03. "Come Over"
 05. "Stay the Night"
 06. "Bravo"
 07. "Mood"
 08. "Next Time/Humble Pie"
 09. "It Gets Better (With Time)"
 11. "Wanna Be"
 12. "Beat Goes On"
 13. "Hold On"

The Jet Age of Tomorrow (The Super 3)

2008

Odd Future - The Odd Future Tape
 03. "Laxin'" (performed by Hodgy Beats)
 05. "Bubble Gum" (performed by Tyler, The Creator, Casey Veggies and Hodgy Beats)
 09. "Money Talk" (performed by Casey Veggies and Hodgy Beats)
 10. "Our Story" (performed by Hodgy Beats)

2010

The Jet Age of Tomorrow - Voyager
 01. "Welcome Aboard Voyager"
 02. "Can I Hold Your Hand?!"
 03. "Friday"
 04. "But She Not My Lover"
 05. "Don't Tell the Mermaids"
 06. "Rapido Eye Movement"
 07. "Revenge of the Ranger Wranglers"
 08. "The Knight Hawk"
 09. "Hercules Cup"
 10. "Orange Juice Simpson"
 11. "Strobe Light
 12. "My Good Girl"
 13. "They Dove Through the Ice Into the Unfathomable Depths of the Abyss"
 14. "Submarine"
 15. "Lisa, Where Have You Been?"
 16. "EUROPA"

The Jet Age of Tomorrow - Journey to the 5th Echelon
 01. "Green Stars (Intro)"
 02. "5th Echelon"
 03. "Pack Up"
 04. "Love In The Purple Forest"
 05. "Dust Off" (featuring Hodgy Beats and Mike G)
 06. "Thump Thump"
 07. "The Fallen Angels" (produced with Left Brain)
 08. "Sunburst" (produced with Tyler Major)
 09. "LunchBox" (featuring Vince Staples and JQ)
 10. "Wonderland"
 13. "The Finer Things" (featuring Om'Mas Keith)
 14. "Protozoa (Yow!)"
 15. "Burfday"
 16. "Sleep!"
 17. "Welcome Home Son" (featuring Casey Veggies and Tyler, The Creator)
 18. "A Happy Ending" (produced with Kream Team)
 19. "Her Secrets" (Bonus track)

2011

Odd Future - 12 Odd Future Songs
 04. "Welcome Home Son" (performed by The Jet Age of Tomorrow featuring Casey Veggies and Tyler, The Creator)
 09. "But She's Not My Lover" (performed by The Jet Age of Tomorrow)

2012

Odd Future - The OF Tape Vol. 2
 04. "Ya Know" (performed by The Internet)

2013

The Jet Age of Tomorrow - JellyFish Mentality
 01. "Warping Walls"
 02. "Special K (Wombat)"
 03. "Desert N' The Dark (JAOT Dub)" (featuring The Stepkids)
 04. "ON!"
 05. "Juney Jones" (featuring Mac Miller and Speak!)
 06. "Panic On Pluto"
 07. "Not So Scary" (featuring Kilo Kish)
 08. "Love In Water"
 09. "Lily Pads"
 10. "A Place Where Lovers Go" (featuring Jesse Boykins III)
 11. "Machines Machines"
 12. "One Take" (featuring Earl Sweatshirt and Casey Veggies)
 13. "SuperFINE"
 14. "Mushy"
 15. "The Door's Door"
 16. "Asia" (featuring Mike G)
 17. "Squares"
 18. "Wonderful World" (featuring Domo Genesis and Vince Staples)
 19. "Naked" (featuring Hodgy Beats)
 20. "Airport"
 21. "Telephones"

2017

The Jet Age of Tomorrow - God's Poop or Clouds?
 01. "Summer is Ending"
 02. "The Long Way Home" 
 03. "Escape City"
 04. "The Jaunt"
 05. "Friday Night/the World's Ending"
 06. "Wool Glasses"
 07. "Ain't a Party"
 08. "Buzzin'"
 09. "Chance" 
 10. "1 A.M"
 11. "LocoMotive"
 12. "Dis Far  Witcha'"
 13. "Fly Like Me"
 14. "What Reality?"
 15. "Come on Wit Me Gurl"

The Super D3Shay

2009

The Super D3Shay - The Super D3Shay
 01. "I Want Eargasms"
 02. "Radio Love"
 03. "The Last Martians"
 05. "Searching For"
 06. "Bad Day"
 07. "We Were"
 08. "Where Is Home"
 09. "Sign Off"

Sweaty Martians

2014

Sweaty Martians 
 "Horn"

References 

Martians, Matt